This page lists board and card games, wargames, miniatures games, and tabletop role-playing games published in 2000.  For video games, see 2000 in video gaming.

Games released or invented in 2000

Game awards given in 2000
 Spiel des Jahres: Torres
 Games: Aladdin's Dragons

Significant games-related events in 2000
Privateer Press founded by Brian Snōddy, Matt Staroscik and Matt Wilson.

Deaths

See also
 2000 in video gaming

Games
Games by year